The Monroes were a new wave band from San Diego active throughout most of the 1980s. They are best known for their single "What Do All the People Know".

Background
For keyboardist Eric Denton, forming the Monroes fulfilled his early fantasies of becoming a rock star. Born in Lansing, Michigan, Denton moved to Ventura, California with his family at a young age, at which point he began immersing himself in piano studies. By the late 1970s, Denton had already performed at several high school dances, when his family moved to San Diego. In addition to his musical talents, by this point, he had also become very savvy on the business and organizational aspects of the music world, an attribute that would serve him well during the Monroes years. Before long, he was playing in the band Peter Rabbitt. However, after touring with this band for a while, Denton returned to San Diego, where he bought a recording studio with the goal of creating a group that played all original material.

While working in the recording studio (Accusound), Denton had brushes with other budding musicians, one of whom was bassist Bob Davis (a.k.a. "Bob Monroe"), with whom he was especially impressed. Before long the two had joined together, forming the nucleus of what would become The Monroes. Another musician who regularly visited the studio was guitarist Rusty Jones, who had previously played with Davis in the Ken Dixon Band (an all-covers band), and he became the next to join this fledgling group. Denton's former Peter Rabbitt bandmate, drummer Jonnie Gilstrap came on board, and the search was then on for a lead singer. The band ultimately decided on Jesus "Tony" Ortiz (a.k.a. "Tony Monroe"), who Denton described as having the ability to "make any song, good or bad, sound great", to fill this capacity.

According to Ortiz, the band's name, "The Monroes" was derived from a band Bob Davis was originally in with the now well-known singer-songwriter Rick Elias called "Rick Elias and the Monroes". In this context, the "Monroes" part of the name was a direct reference to the fact that Elias was originally from Monroe, Louisiana. Once Elias left for a solo career, he allowed Davis to keep the name.

The band began recording demos of early tracks at Accusound, and they began shopping them around the Los Angeles area. They soon recruited John Deverian as their manager, who signed them to a small Japanese label, Alfa Records. Before long, the band was recording what would become their debut EP at Chateau Studios. One of their recent songs was called "What Do All the People Know" which was written by Bob Monroe.

"What Do All the People Know" generated a local buzz around the San Diego area, and it was selected as the first single released from the group's self-titled EP, completed in 1982. They then toured with the likes of Toto, Greg Kihn, and Rick Springfield while their single climbed the charts to #59. However, as the band was pondering ideas for their first music video, they found out that their Japan-based record label Alfa was abandoning its US market. Without the backing of a label, they were left with no North American promotion, and the band's single and mini-album quickly fell off the charts.

The band attempted to continue, signing with CBS, but any new musical projects were shelved. Individual band members gradually quit the group over the next several years. The remaining members would continue until the band eventually broke up in 1988.

Aftermath
After the breakup, bassist Bob Davis joined the band Street Heart. Bob continues to produce, write and perform.

Denton owned Guitar Trader in San Diego, California, which closed, after being a long-time pillar of the San Diego music scene, in December 2014. Jones returned from a long musical hiatus in 2005, and began writing and performing again in the San Diego area. Gilstrap returned to San Diego in 2006 and studied tribal fusion and Middle Eastern drumming. In 2007, Denton had a son named Kyle.

Ortiz left the band in 1986 and, disillusioned with the music business, moved to Minneapolis shortly thereafter. He would remain there for the next twenty years. Then, in 2006, he returned to California, where he reconnected with Jones. By 2007, the two were performing live and did not rule out the possibility of a complete Monroes reunion. Ortiz later returned to Minnesota to be closer to his children and has continued performing on his own there.

Although the band separated years ago, all members in one fashion or another are still involved in their passion for music. Three of the original five band members met in June 2009. Band members included Jonnie Gilstrap, Tony Ortiz and Eric Denton. The three musicians discussed seriously the possibility of reuniting and doing a USA tour.

2013–present: New developments
In 2013, the band released a seven-song EP, What Do All the People Know?, featuring an alternate version of "What Do All the People Know?" (including a portion of the final verse extracted from the version featured on the original 1982 EP) as well as previously unreleased material from their early recording sessions.

On August 28, 2020, a long-awaited "official" music video for "What Do All the People Know?" was released, interpolating the original vision for the video 38 years prior with modern scenes and vintage footage from past Monroes shows.

Discography

EPs
The Monroes (Alfa Records AAE-15015) – 1982 (U.S. version has five tracks)
(The Japanese version of the album (Alfa Records ULR-18001) features "Yamarock", the b-side of the "What Do All the People Know" single as a sixth track and a different cover from the U.S. edition.)
What Do All the People Know? (MusicPower.com) – 2013

Seven-Inch singles
"What Do All the People Know" / "Yamarock" (Alfa Records ALF-7119) 1982 U.S. (reached #59 on the Billboard Hot 100)

Compilations
Each of these albums include the song "What Do All the People Know"
 1994 Living in Oblivion (The 80's Greatest Hits – Volume 3) (EMI E2-27674) U.S.
 1994 Just Can't Get Enough: New Wave Hits of the '80s, Vol. 4 (Rhino R2 71697 ) U.S.
 2001 Shake Some Action Vol. 4 (Shake Some Action SSA 4) Europe

Notes/References

External links
 
[ The Monroes] on Allmusic
More Extensive Bio/Eric Denton Update (Sanford, Jay Allen (2007). "Remember the Monroes??")
Band Photo
The Monroes Founding Member Website – Eric Denton Keyboardist
Rusty Jones' YouTube page
Tony Ortiz' YouTube page
Tony Ortiz' website
Rusty Jones update (includes more extensive Monroes information)
Article about Ortiz and Jones' recent activities
Rusty Jones' MySpace Page
Jonnie Gilstrap's MySpace Page
BidOnSound, (Exclusive Music related Online Action)- Eric Denton, Co-founder

American pop music groups
American new wave musical groups
Musical groups disestablished in 1988
Musical groups from San Diego